Al Shouf Cedar Nature Reserve is a nature reserve in the Chouf and Aley districts of Lebanon.

The reserve contains the Lebanon cedar forests of Barouk, Maaser el Shouf and Ain Zhalta-Bmohray. It is an Important Bird Area (IBA) and Eco-tourism area. It hosts 32 species of wild mammals, 200 species of birds, and 500 species of plants.

Geodiversity
The Barouk mountain comprises rocks from the Pliocene which have undergone major tectonic movement that divided the mountains of Lebanon into two parallel parts; the eastern range is called the Anti-Lebanon, and the western range is called Mount Lebanon. The two mountain ranges are separated by the Beqaa Valley, which is composed of recent infill sediments. The main rocks are limestone. The whole of the Barouk Mountain is cavernous limestone, with many surface features such as dolines indicating the underlying cavernous forms of the mountain range. Villagers report an abundance of stalactites and stalagmites and that there is an underground body of water.

The trend from north to south is for the eastern slopes to change from very steep to less steep and for the western slopes to become increasingly steep. The top of the Barouk range becomes increasingly narrow towards the south.

 Hydrology:

Precipitation in the watershed is the source of both surface streamflow and groundwater. The major portion of this occurs as rain. Snowfall often occurs at the upper elevations but snow seldom persists more than a few days and disappears before the end of the rainy season.
Normally snow has little overall direct effect on stream-flow within the watershed. However, on rare occasions warm rains falling on the snow-pack may result in rapid melting and release of large quantities of water at a time when the soils are already fully saturated. These conditions result in rapid runoff and floods. A large proportion of the exposed surface rock in the Barouk region is cavernous, fissured and broken limestone, and its porous condition makes it very permeable. This results in much of the precipitation infiltrating with minimum surface runoff despite the often-shallow soils and sparse vegetative cover. Water percolates downward through the various formations and feeds the many large springs found on lower slopes in the area. Such springs help maintain stream-flow during the April to November dry season.
Surface water flows originating on the range are mostly seasonal but some are perennial.
Underground water generates outflow rivers such as:
- Al Awali River, more commonly known as Al-Barouk river
- Damour River, known as Al-Safa river
The summit of the range is considered as a divide between two hydrological systems because of the difference between the two slopes of the mountain. The eastern slope is much steeper and favors surface stream flows, whereas the western slope is less steep and favors ground water aquifers.
The rivers that flow in the valleys are the major source of agriculture irrigation and supply a dozen Shouf villages with domestic water and some of the western Bekaa villages. It is also the main source of water for the Aammiq Swamp in the Bekaa.

 Pedology:
 Homogenous, belonging to the red brown Mediterranean soils formed on hard marl limestone.
 derived from Jurassic, Balthonian, Callovian to Oxfordien - Portlandian marl limestone.
 Stone contents ranges from 80 - 90%.
From an erosion point of view these soils are in a state of equilibrium due to:
 High permeability.
 Mask of calcareous fragments.
 Good vegetative cover.
 Good drainage.
 Climatology:
The mean relative humidity lies around 65% but the eastern slopes are slightly drier. There are about 50 to 55 days of snow fall per year, depending on the information provided by the Ministry of Public Work and Transport.

Biodiversity
 Flora
The flora of the Al-Shouf Cedar area is partly covered by Mouterde's 1966, 1970 and 1983 flora of Lebanon. The most recent and extensive botanical researches on the official site were conducted, on behalf of the Ministry of Environment (Protected Areas Project), by (Georges Tohmé) the National Council for Scientific Research (NCSR) in 1999. Since then extremely few flora reports on the official site were published or known. Tohmé continued his field botanical studies at Al-Shouf Cedar Reserve during the last three years in order to obtain confirmation on the status of certain species. His recent new findings are published in Tohmé, G. & Tohmé, H. (2002). Few of them are incorporated here and the others will be added to the final report of the present study-project. The list of Al-Shouf Cedar Reserve species includes 500 identified species distributed over 61 families. Also the reserve is habitat to 25 internationally and nationally threatened species, 48 endemic to Lebanon or Lebanon and Syria or Lebanon and Turkey, and 14 rare species, whilst 214 species are restricted to the Eastern Mediterranean or Middle East area.
 

The reserve is also home to 24 tree species, of which some are found in Europe and the Mediterranean area as well as in Lebanon. The reserve is known for its official's efforts to save the cedar of Lebanon through continues management of the forests and planting new trees in previously logged and deforestated areas. The reserve form the last natural limits to the spread of Cedrus libani on the planet. The reserve is also known for the ability of the forests to regenerate by their own without any human interference. Other tree species in the reserve include : Cyprus oak (Quercus infectoria ), Brant’s oak (Quercus brantii), kermes oak (Quercus calliprinos), Calabrian pine (Pinus brutia), Aleppo pine (Pinus halepensis), stone pine (Pinus pinea), Greek juniper (Juniperus excelca), Syrian juniper (Arceuthos drupacea).

 Fauna
Mammals: Mammal explorations in Lebanon were limited until around the middle of the twentieth century. They are fragmentary and provided little information on the mammals inhabiting the country. Many species and subspecies were not yet recorded for Lebanon till the 1970s.
Between 1980 and 1985, Tohmé, G. and Tohmé, H. alone produced 33% of the known published papers on the Lebanese mammals. The only documented data of the mammals of Al-Shouf Cedar Reserve apparently appeared in the report of Tohmé, H. that was prepared, on behalf of the Protected Areas Project at the Ministry of Environment, in 1999 by the NCSR. This report, which was based on inventory and surveys as well as brochures and other documents developed by the managing team of the reserve, produced a list of 32 mammals which include: wild boar (Sus scrofa), gray wolf (Canis lupus ), beech marten (Martes foina), mountain gazelle (Gazella gazella), golden jackal (Canis aureus), red fox (Vulpes vulpes), European badger (Meles meles), Cape hare (Lepus capensis), Caucasian squirrel (Sciurus anomalus), roe deer (Capreolus capreolus), Persian fallow deer (Dama dama mesopotamica), wild goat (Capra aegagrus), Syrian brown bear (Ursus arctos syriacus), Middle East blind mole-rat (Nannospalax ehrenbergi) Indian porcupine (Hystrix indica), striped hyena (Hyaena hyaena), wild cat (Felis silvestris), Cape hyrax (Procavia capensis). The reserve launched a project to reintroduce the Nubian ibex (Capra nubiana) to the area from Jordan, after it was extinct in the mid-twentieth century. The reserve was most probably home to the Anatolian leopard (Panthera pardus tulliana) which are extinct now in Lebanon. The aurochs (Bos primigenius) may have existed in the area in the middle ages as well.

Birds: The reserve is home to 200 species of birds, of which 19 are considered rare at the national level. More than 22 species have been confirmed to be resident, the rest are migratory or rare visitors, and at least two or three species have been introduced. The reserve holds a combination of birds found in Europe, Africa, and Asia which include: chukar (Alectoris chukar), Eurasian jay (Garrulus glandarius), blackbird (Turdus merula), common raven (Corvus corax), common kestrel (Falco tinnunculus), shore lark (Eremophila alpestris), common redstart (Phoenicurus phoenicurus), common chaffinch, (Fringilla coelebs), turtle dove (Streptopelia turtur), rock sparrow (Petronia petronia), European goldfinch (Carduelis carduelis). 
Two species at least have been introduced to the shouf area for hunting and expanded their range into the reserve, the two species are: rock partridge (Alectoris graeca), and common pheasant (Phasianus colchicus). The reserve is also home to many species of birds of prey such as: griffon vulture (Gyps fulvus), and the golden eagle (Aquila chrysaetos).

Reptiles and amphibians: Al-shouf cedar reserve is home to a rich variety of reptiles, 26 species were documented with two species endemic to Lebanon and the chouf area in particular. The reserve is also home to four species of amphibians, almost the same number of species found in the whole of Lebanon. The species include: Palestinian viper (Vipera palaestinae), Greek tortoise (Testudo graeca), Mediterranean chameleon (Chamaeleon chamaeleon), European copper skink (Ablepharus kitaibelii), common toad (Bufo bufo), European green toad (Bufo viridis), Arouss Al Ayn (Salamandra infraimmaculata), Middle East tree frog (Hyla savignyi).

Cultural heritage
 The cedars:
The cedar forests of Lebanon enjoy the unique distinction as the oldest documented forests in history. The cedars were important enough in the history of man to be traceable to the very earliest written records, that of the Sumerians in the third millennium BC. In the ancient Sumerian story, The Epic of Gilgamesh, one of the oldest pieces of literature in the world, the cedars feature prominently. Gilgamesh has since been recognized as King Gilgamesh of history and in probability visited Mount Lebanon.
 Historic cultural sites:

The setting of the Shouf is a nexus of many cultures, religions, and historical events, all of which have left an imprint which makes the area's cultural heritage as rich as its ecosystems. The following are some major landmarks:
 Qalaat Niha:
The cave castle of Tyron Niha relates to one of the closing episodes of Prince Fakhreddin II's epic history and are the only remaining vestiges of a once powerful fortress which was successively used by the Arabs, Crusaders, and a number of princes of Mount Lebanon.
 El Nabi Ayoub:
A feretory was built on the hill above the village of Niha to honor Job's memory and hold his relics. Ayoub is the Arabic name of the prophet Job.
 Qab Elias Castle:
This once powerful Druze fortress served as a guardian outpost controlling the road that linked Beirut to Damascus, and a marching post for the Druze and Chehab rulers of the South Bekaa or Wadi al-Taym.
 Mazar El Sit Cha'wane:
El Sit Cha'wane is a famous figure in the Druze religion. Like Job in the Old Testament, she was held up as a model of virtue and devotion. A feretory was erected in her name.

See also
 Horsh Ehden
 Aammiq Wetland

External links
 Al Shouf Cedar Nature Reserve official website
 Place Location on Wikimapia

Nature reserves in Lebanon
Important Bird Areas of Lebanon
Forests of Lebanon
Biosphere reserves of Lebanon
Tourist attractions in Lebanon
Chouf District